The Tampere Open is a professional tennis tournament played on clay courts. It is currently part of the ATP Challenger Tour, and has been held annually at the Tampere Tennis Center in Tampere, Finland, since 2008 (and 2007 for the women's ITF). Prior to that the ATP challenger was held at the Pyynikki tennis courts from 1982–2007.

Past finals

Men's singles

Men's doubles

Women's singles

Women's doubles

References

External links
 Official website 

 
ATP Challenger Tour
ITF Women's World Tennis Tour
Clay court tennis tournaments
Recurring sporting events established in 1982
Sport in Tampere
Tennis tournaments in Finland